Mount Fainter South is a mountain in the Victorian Alps of the Great Dividing Range, located in the Australian state of Victoria.

See also 

 List of mountains in Victoria

References

External links 
 

Mountains of Victoria (Australia)
Victorian Alps
Mountains of Hume (region)